St. Ninian's High School is a Roman Catholic co-educational comprehensive secondary school, located in Kirkintilloch, East Dunbartonshire, on the banks of the Forth and Clyde Canal.

Admissions
There are currently over 900 students in attendance with an average of 5/6 classes in each year. Each class has no more than 30 pupils. St Ninians is a Roman Catholic School.

School roll

Academic performance
The school has consistently proved to be successful in a number of different areas – SQA results, the Charter Mark award, Investors in People recognition and the Scottish Education Award for “Raising Basic Standards”. In 2008, David Miller, an English Teacher, won the  UK Secondary Teacher of the Year at the National Teaching Awards, and, in 2009, Headteacher Paul McLaughlin won the Scottish Secondary Head Teacher of the Year.

History
St Ninian's opened in 1874 in the town centre on Union Street. The school then moved to a new site in 1931 on the sight of the former Westermains House on Bellfield Road. It then moved from Bellfield Road to the former Thomas Muir campus in Bishopbriggs during the demolition and complete rebuild of the Bellfield Road Campus. As of August 2009, is back in Bellfield Road.

Celtic Youth Academy
St Ninian's High, in partnership with Celtic F.C. is at the forefront of a groundbreaking sporting initiative, the first of its type in Scotland. This allows the Celtic Academy players, who are pupils in S1 to S5, to combine intensive coaching sessions with a programme of studies based on continental methods, where everything is monitored including behaviour and homework.

Feeder schools
 Holy Family Primary School, Lenzie.
 Holy Trinity Primary School, Kirkintilloch.
 St Nicholas' Primary School, Milngavie.
 St Machan's Primary School, Lennoxtown.

Notable former pupils

 Theresa Breslin, (born 1947), author
 Paul Buchanan, musician (The Blue Nile)
 Peter Capaldi (born 1958), actor
 Stephen Crainey (born 1981), footballer
 John Hendrie, footballer
 Bishop Joseph Devine, (born 1937), Bishop of Motherwell
 Des McKeown, (born 1970), footballer
 Charlie Mulgrew, (born 1986), footballer
 Bishop Ian Murray (born 1932), Bishop Emeritus of the Roman Catholic Diocese of Argyll and the Isles
 Katie Sutherland, musician (Pearl and the Puppets)
 David McErlane, musician (Makethisrelate)
 Paul Wilson, (born 1950), footballer

References

External links

St Ninian's High School's page on Scottish Schools Online
 French trip

Catholic secondary schools in East Dunbartonshire
Educational institutions established in 1874
Kirkintilloch

Lenzie
1874 establishments in Scotland
Youth football in Scotland
Celtic F.C.